Ichthyophis elongatus, the elongated caecilian, is a species of amphibians in the family Ichthyophiidae endemic to Sumatra, including some nearby islands; however, whether these belong to this species is uncertain.

Specimens allocated to this species with certainty have been collected from lowland forest and from a ravine near degraded forest.

The type series varied  in total length.

References

elongatus
Amphibians described in 1965
Amphibians of Indonesia
Endemic fauna of Indonesia
Taxonomy articles created by Polbot